Kala Suri Premasara Epasinghe (born 5 October 1937), is a Sri Lankan cricket commentator and journalist. Considered as an iconic radio personality in Sri Lankan radio, Premasara became a household name in Sri Lankan cricket commentary history.

Early life and education
He was born on 5 October 1937 in College House of University of Colombo, Sri Lanka. His father Don Ranoris Epasinghe from Galtota, Panadura was an administrative officer at the Colombo University. His mother Podinona Peiris from Mavitte, Galle, was a teacher. He first went to Visakha Vidyalaya, Colombo, which at that time was a mixed school. In 1950, when Premasara was 13 years old, his mother died. Premasara had four older brothers where all of them died within a year of their birth.

Then he was attended to Nalanda College, Colombo and studied in English medium. In 1956 during the Inter-house sports meet, he started to play cricket for his school team "Chandra". Even though he did not play hard ball before that, he made a significant impact in the match, where he scored 78 runs and his house "Chandra" scored a total of 148 runs. Finally "Chandra" won the match. After that innings, he was invited to play for the college team under the guidance of college cricket coach Kandasamy. He was the only Nalandian player who had the opportunity to join the senior team directly without competing in the junior teams.

His first opportunity to compete after joining the senior team was in 1957 against St. Anthony's College, Kandy. In the match he was the opening batsman with Sarath Silva and also the wicket keeper. In the same year, he played nine matches before the Ananda-Nalanda match in the first three months.  In the meantime, in five matches, Sarath Silva and Epasinge went over the 100-run partnership for the first wicket. Premasara represented Nalanda for 28th Ananda-Nalanda big match which was held at P. Sara Oval. However he scored only two runs in the first innings, nine runs in second innings and got two catches as the wicket keeper. With the match, he ended the school cricket career which merely lasts for three months.

In November 1968, he married Swarna Samararatne who worked as a teacher at Stafford Girls' College, Colombo. The couple has one son, Bhagya and one daughter, Apsara. Bhagya studied at Nalanda College, Colombo and after Ordinary Level exam he moved to St.Thomas'. He then became Thomian opener in 1989 and University of Ceylon Colombo in the 1990s. He is currently a Director of Finance in Canberra, Australia. His daughter Apsara Gunasekera is a Squash player for Sri Lanka.

Career
He passed the college senior examination on 30 March 1958 with highest distinctions. Meanwhile, he went to the temple to meet the Chief Incumbent of the Valukarama Temple in Kollupitiya, Ven. Mavittara Sri Revatha Nayaka Thero, who was actually Premasara's father's older brother. Thero asked Premasara to teach English in the Mahanama college starting at the temple on 5 May 1958. He was the one who suggested the quote from the “Vidwan Sarvatdhara Pujate” (Age is always looking around) which is still used in Mahanama College.

Meanwhile, in 1959, he applied for a journalist vacancy in the Lake House and later selected as a sports reporter under D. C. Ranatunga. However he was able to balance both the teaching profession and the media profession at the same time. In 1962, he applied Lanka Radio as a relief announcer. Even though he received the job in Lanka Radio, he was also selected to the Vidyodaya University (currently known as University of Sri Jayewardenepura). In 1963, he entered the Faculty of Arts of the Vidyodaya University and chose Sinhala, English, Educational Science and History. Educational science was a new subject in the university stream at that time and only taught in English medium. Professor Clarence P. Noise of the University of Wisconsin, USA, came to Sri Lanka for two years and taught that subject with two local lecturers: Professors KHM Sumathipala and P Aranpaththa.

During this period, he was also appointed for reporting on the senate and parliamentary sessions of the day under the supervision of D. C. Ranatunga and U. L. Chandrathilaka. At the same time, he took the initiation to establish a cricket club at Vidyodaya University. In 1966, the annual cricket match between Vidyalankara and Vidyodaya Universities has started. During the graduation year in 1967 with Bachelor of Arts degree, he was appointed as the teacher in Sigiriya Maha Vidyalaya. On 14 October of that year, Epasinghe was the first to report about damages caused to the Sigiriya murals through Lake House publications.

Premasara was later appointed to Nalanda College in January 1968 as a teacher. Accordingly, he was given the responsibility of teaching Sinhala at the Advanced Level and working as the teacher in charge of cricket. After the birth of his son Bhagya, Epasinghe retired from the teaching and joined the Bank of Ceylon (BOC). At the same time, he introduced the radio program "Aradhana" to the Sri Lanka Broadcasting Corporation during his tenure as the BOC's first Public Relations Officer. During this time, Epasinghe also played for the Mercantile Cricket Club as the opening batsman as well as the wicketkeeper. He also played club cricket for the University, Bank of Ceylon, Saracens and Nationalized Services. He made a memorable knock of 136 which he made for the Bank of Ceylon against Ceylon Insurance.

During the early 1970s, he was invited by Gunaratne Abeysekara who worked as a radio program producer, to be a radio cricket commentator. Accordingly, with the support of Nanda Jayamanne, in charge of the evening service of the Sri Lanka Broadcasting Corporation, Premasara joined SLBC. In a career spanned for more than four decades, he worked as a cricket commentator in various domestic and international cricket tournaments. His first commentary as a cricket commentator was in 1971 Royal–Thomian where he did commentary together with Palitha Perera. Premasara was also the cricket commentator at Sri Lanka's ever first test match, 100th and 150th. As he said, his most notable and unforgettable match commentary came through the 1996 Cricket World Cup final between Sri Lanka and Australia played at the Gadhafi Stadium in Pakistan.

He has worked as the press secretary or the media consultant to many Ministers and was the former private secretary and media consultant to the Minister of Education.

In 2018, he received an award of excellence at the Sri Jayewardenepura Awards ceremony. On 11 December 2020, he was honored with the Gold Lifetime Achievement award at the inaugural 'Sabuddhi Sports Literary Awards'.

References

External links
 Darling we aren't too old, though we pass the Jubilee Gold
 To Sir with Love

Sri Lankan cricket commentators
Sri Lankan radio personalities
Sri Lankan Buddhists
Alumni of Nalanda College, Colombo
Living people
Place of birth missing (living people)
Alumni of the University of Sri Jayewardenepura
Faculty of Nalanda College, Colombo
1937 births